Providence is an upcoming comedy mystery independent film, directed by Potsy Ponciroli and filmed in North Carolina. The film stars Joseph Gordon-Levitt, Lily James, Himesh Patel and Tim Blake Nelson, and was written by Michael Vukadinovich.

Synopsis
A cop in a small island town has to investigate a murder and the discovery of a large sum of money.

Cast

Joseph Gordon-Levitt
Lily James
Himesh Patel
Tim Blake Nelson
Joey Lauren Adams
Uzo Aduba
Jim Gaffigan
Traci Lords
Simon Rex 
Nina Arianda
Neva Howell
José María Yazpik
Yingling Zhu

Production
The project initially took place under the title The Problem with Providence. In May, 2022 it was announced that filming was starting with  Lily James, Joseph Gordon-Levitt and Himesh Patel appearing in the Limelight, Boies Schiller Entertainment and Hideout Pictures financed and produced film directed by Potsy Ponciroli from a Michael Vukadinovich script. Producers are David Boies, Zack Schiller, Shannon Houchins, Dylan Sellers and Chris Parker with executive producers Tyler Zacharia, Sam Slater, Phil Keefe and Dane Eckerle with Vukadinovich. On 13 May, 2022 it was revealed that Tim Blake Nelson, Uzo Aduba, Simon Rex, Nina Arianda, Jim Gaffigan, José María Yazpik and Joey Lauren Adams had joined the cast. Filming took place in the Brunswick County town of Southport between 9 May and 11 June, 2022.

Release
The film has been reported to have a 2023 release, although no date has been confirmed.

References

External links

Upcoming films
2020s comedy mystery films
2020s crime comedy films
American comedy mystery films
American crime comedy films
American detective films
Murder mystery films
2020s English-language films
2020s American films
Films shot in North Carolina